Keyon is a given name. Notable people with the given name include:

Keyon Dooling (born 1980), American basketball player
Keyon Harrold (born 1980), American jazz trumpeter, vocalist, songwriter and producer
Keyon Nash (born 1979), American football player
Keyon Whiteside (born 1980), American football player